Paul Miller (born November 17, 1982) is an American former professional basketball player. A 6'10" center/forward from Jefferson City, Missouri, Miller was an honorable mention All-American player at Wichita State University.

College career
After starring at Blair Oaks High School in Jefferson City, Miller played collegiately for coach Mark Turgeon at Wichita State.  Three games into his freshman year in 2001, Miller broke his foot and was lost for the season. After a redshirt year spent adding weight, Miller averaged 7.4 points and 4.7 rebounds per game in 2002–03 NCAA Division I men's basketball season and was named to the Missouri Valley Conference (MVC) All-Freshman team.  Miller increased his scoring average each of the next three years.

As a senior in 2005–06, Miller led the Shockers to a regular-season MVC championship and an at large berth in the 2006 NCAA Tournament.  Once there, the Shockers made the most of their trip, defeating Seton Hall in the first round and upsetting second seeded Tennessee in the second round to advance to the Sweet Sixteen for the fourth time in school history.  For the season, Miller averaged 13.1 points and 6.6 rebounds and was named first team All-MVC and MVC Player of the Year.  He was later named an honorable mention All-American by the Associated Press.

Professional career
Following his college career, Miller was not selected in the 2006 NBA Draft.  He was invited to play for the New York Knicks Summer League team, but did not make the final roster.  Miller headed for Germany to play for Eisbären Bremerhaven of the Basketball Bundesliga, where he averaged 4.7 points and 2.3 rebounds per game.  The next few years, Miller played in Poland (for Polonia Warbud Warszawa and WTK Anwil Wloclawek), Russia (for BC Triumph Lyubertsy) and Turkey (for Aliağa Petkim and Bandırma Kırmızı).  In 2012, he signed with JDA Dijon Basket of France's first division.

Commentator
In 2017, Miller served as an analyst for Cox Channel Kansas covering his alma mater.

References

External links

TBLStat.net Profile
French League profile
German League profile

1982 births
Living people
Aliağa Petkim basketball players
American expatriate basketball people in France
American expatriate basketball people in Germany
American expatriate basketball people in Poland
American expatriate basketball people in Russia
American expatriate basketball people in Turkey
American men's basketball players
Basketball players from Missouri
BC Zenit Saint Petersburg players
Centers (basketball)
Eisbären Bremerhaven players
JDA Dijon Basket players
KK Włocławek players
Polonia Warszawa (basketball) players
Power forwards (basketball)
Śląsk Wrocław basketball players
Sportspeople from Jefferson City, Missouri
Wichita State Shockers men's basketball players